Lindsey Lamar (born September 19, 1990) is a former American football player. He played college football at the University of South Florida and attended Hillsborough High School in Tampa, Florida. He played for the Hamilton Tiger-Cats of the Canadian Football League.

College career
Lamar played for the South Florida Bulls from 2009 to 2012. He earned First Team All-Big East and Big East Special Teams Player of the Year honors in 2010.

Professional career

Lamar was signed by the Hamilton Tiger-Cats on May 29, 2013. Lamar had a 104-yard kick return touchdown in his CFL debut on June 28, 2013, against the Toronto Argonauts. He was named Special Teams Player of the Week for Week One of the 2013 CFL season.

He was released by the Tiger-Cats on September 10, 2014.

Personal life
Lamar's cousin, Nigel Harris, also played college football at South Florida.

References

External links
Just Sports Stats

Living people
1990 births
Players of American football from Tampa, Florida
Players of Canadian football from Tampa, Florida
American football running backs
Canadian football running backs
American football return specialists
Place of birth missing (living people)
Canadian football return specialists
African-American players of American football
African-American players of Canadian football
South Florida Bulls football players
Hamilton Tiger-Cats players
21st-century African-American sportspeople